"Now or Never" is the twenty-fourth episode and the season finale of the fifth season of the American television medical drama, Grey's Anatomy and the show's 102nd episode overall. Written by Debora Cahn and directed by Rob Corn, the episode was originally broadcast on the American Broadcasting Company (ABC) in the United States on May 14, 2009. The initial airing was viewed by 17.12 million viewers and garnered a 6.2/17 Nielsen rating/share in the 18–49 demographic. The episode received widespread critical acclaim, with particular praise directed towards Katherine Heigl's performance. It marked the last regular appearance of original cast member T. R. Knight, who played Dr. George O'Malley who got into an accident during the episode and dies in the season 6 premiere. He later returns in season 17 as part of a dream of Meredith Grey.

In the episode Cristina Yang (Sandra Oh), Alex Karev (Justin Chambers), George O'Malley (T. R. Knight), and Meredith Grey (Ellen Pompeo) are all sleeping and waiting for Izzie Stevens (Katherine Heigl) to wake up after a surgery to treat her cancer. Derek Shepherd (Patrick Dempsey) comes up with an alternative treatment plan for Izzie, Miranda Bailey (Chandra Wilson) confronts the Chief, Richard Webber (James Pickens Jr.), and Arizona Robbins (Jessica Capshaw) about the paediatric fellowship program. Yang deals with her relationship with Owen Hunt (Kevin McKidd), who helps George with career advice and influences his choice to enter the US Army. This episode also focuses on Meredith and Derek's post-it wedding.

Plot
Cristina is still deliberating reconciling her relationship with Owen, however she has not completely forgiven him. Owen stops to tell her how well his therapy is going and how much progress is being made, but Cristina cuts him off by asking if he's told her about not visiting his mother even though she lives only a few miles away.

Derek has formed a plan to remove Izzie's brain tumor, but it will require removing a part of her brain, which could leave her without any memory. Izzie tries to get the others to decide, but they only offer to support her unconditionally with her own decision.  However, they later decide to find out more information in order to make an informed decision. To see the worst possible outcome of the surgery, the doctors agree to run a neurological test. During the test, Izzie cannot remember the pictures on the flashcards or other people and she can’t even speak. This unsettles Meredith, who tells Izzie that she cannot possibly have the surgery. Izzie eventually decides to have the surgery, but signs a Do Not Resuscitate order to avoid the possibility of being in a vegetative state. Alex, who had spontaneously married Izzie earlier in the season, panics about the idea of living without her.

Later on, Cristina sees Owen hug George and asks what's wrong. Owen tells her that George has some news but he wants everyone to hear it from George himself, then changes the subject, saying he’s happy that he finally slept through the night with no nightmares.

Chief Webber calls Bailey into his office with Robbins to tell her that she's received the pediatric fellowship. Rather than being excited, Bailey simply walks away. She later tells Robbins and Webber that her husband, Tucker Jones (Cress Williams), gave her an ultimatum the night before - if she takes the fellowship, he will divorce her. She plans on leaving him, stating her belief that there is no place for ultimatums in a marriage, but doesn't think she can do the fellowship as a single mother. Instead, she decides to stay in general surgery with hopes to become an attending.

Meredith and Derek have decided not to wait any longer to get married and go to City Hall that evening, but later realize that they won’t make it in time. Instead, Derek writes their vows down on a post-it note that they both sign and then stick in Meredith’s locker.

Meanwhile, a John Doe is brought into the ER who was hit by a bus in order to save a stranger, injuring his face beyond recognition. The woman he saved is called Amanda (Shannon Lucio), and she keeps checking on him and calling him "her hero", "Prince Charming" and similar names. When Meredith checks on John Doe, he attempts to trace something on her hand that she doesn’t understand, so she tries to get him to hold a pen; however, he is too weak and Meredith says that he can try again later. Eventually, John Doe successfully traces the numbers “007” on Meredith’s hand, referring to George O’Malley’s nickname that he earned in the show’s first season after freezing up in his first surgery. Meredith realises that John Doe is George, and runs to tell the other doctors; they rush him into the operating room.

Izzie wakes up from her surgery. When Derek examines her, she seems to have retained her memory and is in good health. She's very happy when Derek tells her that he managed to resect the entire tumor, but five minutes later asks how the surgery went, as if she was never told. It quickly becomes apparent that she has no short term memory at all. Alex becomes worried and starts drilling her to improve her memory, but it doesn't seem to work. Twenty minutes later, when Cristina comes into check on Izzie, she vents to Cristina about the things Alex says. It takes them a few minutes, but they realize that Izzie's memory is back. Alex comes rushing in and hugs Izzie; everyone is happy until Izzie’s heart suddenly stops.

Alex begins CPR to save her, but Chief Webber and the interns try to remind him of Izzie’s DNR to no avail. Finally, Webber gives in and decides to forego the order, calling for the defibrillator. While the doctors attempt to restart Izzie’s heart, she has a vision similar to a scene in ‘Losing My Religion’, the season finale of season two in which she finds out about the death of Denny Duquette, Jr (Jeffrey Dean Morgan). However, in Izzie’s vision, instead of seeing Denny when she leaves the elevator, she sees George in an army uniform.

The episode, as well as the season, is left on a cliffhanger as it is not immediately revealed what happens to George or Izzie.

Production

News of Knight's possible exit was first reported by Entertainment Weekly. The reports said, "T. R. Knight, who has played lovable intern George O'Malley since the show's debut, has asked producers to write him off the hit medical drama." The finale had the highly publicized exit for T. R. Knight with numerous rumors surfacing around the actor's exit. Fans were shocked when Knight made the surprising decision to leave Grey's Anatomy, the hit medical drama that launched him to fame.

Reports became public that Knight had not been attending table-reads for upcoming episodes or that he had walked off the set and cleaned out his dressing room are inaccurate, a rep for Knight told People."He has been there every day. He was at a table read yesterday. He hasn't said goodbye to anyone." The rep had no further comment on his possible exit." The site further reported that Knight was still upset about former cast member Isaiah Washington's alleged use of a homophobic slur about him in an argument with co-star Patrick Dempsey, which prompted Knight to reveal he was gay, and which some felt series creator Shonda Rhimes took too long to rectify with Washington's dismissal, but a source familiar with Grey's said the speculations were false.

While Knight doesn't specifically fault Rhimes for how the situation was handled behind the scenes, he says the exec producer was among those who tried to discourage him from coming out: "I think she was concerned about having my statement come out so close to the [initial] event." Rhimes denied this, "I said, 'If you want to come out, that's awesome. We'll totally support that.' And then he went away, thought about it, and came back and said, 'I'm going to make this statement.' I remember saying to [fellow executive producer] Betsy Beers, 'This is our proudest day here. T. R. got to come out, and I got to say to him that it wouldn't affect his character'. The idea that a gay actor can't play a straight man is insulting."

Creator Shonda Rhimes gave exclusive interview to Michael Ausiello of Entertainment Weekly on May 15, 2009 and talked about Knight’s alleged unhappiness. About his character's absence from the season and the final scene between George O'Malley and the show's protagonist Meredith Grey Rhimes said - 

When asked if T. R. asked to be released from his contract, Rhimes said, "I absolutely am not going to talk about any private conversations I had with the actors. I feel like that invades their privacy." and added, "I think that there have been lots of rumors about T. R., but T. R.’s never said anything. Take from it what you will."

Later, in an exclusive interview with EW, the actor revealed what led him to his decision. Due to what he called a gradual "breakdown of communication" between himself and exec producer Rhimes, the actor chose not to ask his boss what was going on with his character. He added "My five-year experience proved to me that I could not trust any answer that was given [about George]," he explains. "And with respect, I'm going to leave it at that." He also added that knows he's taking a risk walking away from his top 10 show and $14 million contract. "From an outsider's perspective, I get the [impression that] 'He's just a spoiled actor...he doesn't know how good he has it,'" he says. "There are a lot of people who would like to be in my position. But in the end, I need to be fulfilled in my work."

Reception

The episode was originally broadcast on the American Broadcasting Company (ABC) in the United States on May 14, 2009. The initial airing was viewed by 17.12 million viewers and garnered a 6.2/17 Nielsen rating/share in the 18–49 demographic.

The episode received widespread critical acclaim from television critics. IGN Entertainment called the season and the finale a return to form for the show adding, "The season proved to be an overall success, bringing the show closer to the well-balanced mix of emotion and drama – albeit of the primetime soap variety – that characterized its first 3 seasons. Hopefully, the sixth season will continue to build upon this foundation while better planning its arcs so that everything feels more cohesive. Otherwise, a return to form for a show that had seemingly flatlined."

PopSugar wrote, "Izzie might be dying! George might be dying! As the episode fades to black, the two of them are meeting — in an elevator, natch — with Izzie in her pink prom dress and George in his army uniform, while back on earth, their colleagues try furiously to save them. I suppose those of us who wanted answers about whether Katherine Heigl and T. R. Knight are leaving are out of luck — but wow, what an ending!" Speaking of Meredith and Derek's wedding, the site wrote, "I'm curious to know how the hardcore Mer-Der fans take this, but I thought the whole act was touching (not to mention their actual vows: to love each other even when they hate each other, to never walk out even when they're old, smelly and senile). Probably they should get around to having an actual legal marriage one of these days, but for now, that post-it is enough for me." The site also lauded Sandra Oh and Kevin McKidd saying, "every scene with Cristina and Owen feels so tense I can barely breathe."

Alan Sepinwall also gave a positive review and wrote, "Great use of the core-cast, particularly the Cristina Yang/Owen Hunt scenes in the first hour and the Izzie Stevens/Alex Karev scenes in both (regardless of my lack of surprise, Katherine Heigl and Justin Chambers were both great). Chandra Wilson continued to stand tall above the rest of the cast with the Bailey scenes in both episodes, particularly her crying in front of the Chief. And Meredith and Derek getting "married" via Post-It note was so perfect for their characters." He added, "I wish I was able to go into this one pristine, but I wasn't, and I still liked a lot of it. During those fallow periods in the middle of the last few seasons, people kept asking me why I was still watching and/or blogging about Grey's Anatomy. This last batch of episodes is why. This show is a free-swinging power-hitter. When it swings and misses, it looks horrendous. But when it connects with the pitch it wants, all you can do is sit back and admire it."

References

External links
 

Grey's Anatomy (season 5) episodes
2009 American television episodes